The Nakhichevan Khanate (Azerbaijani:ناخچیوان خانلیغی,Naxçıvan xanlığı) was a khanate that was established in Afsharid Persia in 1747.

The territory of the khanate corresponded to most of the present-day Nakhchivan Autonomous Republic and Vayots Dzor Province of present-day Armenia. It was named after its chief settlement, the town of Nakhchivan.

History
Until the demise of the Safavid Empire, Nakhchivan remained as an administrative jurisdiction of the Erivan Province (also known as Chokhur-e Sa'd). Shortly after the recapture of Yerevan in 1604 during the Ottoman–Safavid War of 1603–1618, then incumbent king (shah) Abbas I (r. 1588–1620) appointed as its new governor Cheragh Sultan Ustajlu, who, after his brief tenure, was succeeded by Maqsud Sultan. Maqsud Sultan was a military commander who hailed from the Kangarlu branch of the Ustajlu tribe, the latter being one of the original Qizilbash tribes that had supplied power to the Safavids since its earliest days. The Kangarlu were described by J. M. Jouannin as “a small tribe established in Persian Armenia on the shores of the Aras". Later that year, as Ottoman forces threatened the area during the same war, Shah Abbas ordered Maqsud Sultan to evacuate the entire population of the Nakhchivan region (including the Armenians of Jolfa, who, in the following year, were transplanted to Isfahan) to Qaraja Dag (Arasbaran) and Dezmar. Persian rule was interrupted by Ottoman occupation between 1635-1636 and 1722–1736. It officially became a full functioning khanate during the Afsharid dynasty. Initially the territory of Nakhchivan was part of the Erivan Khanate, but later came to be ruled by a separate khan.

During the Russo-Persian War of 1804–1813, in 1808 Russian forces under general Gudovich briefly occupied Nakhchivan, but as a result of the Treaty of Gulistan it was returned to Persian control.

During the Russo-Persian War of 1826–1828, in 1827 Abbas Mirza appointed Ehsan Khan Kangarlu as commander of Abbasabad, a fortress of strategic importance for the defense of the Nakhchivan khanate. After heavy losses in an attempt to take the fortress by escalade on July 14, the Russians mounted a siege. Ehsan Khan secretly contacted the Russian commander, General Paskevich, and opened the gates of the fortress to him on 22 July 1827. With the Treaty of Turkmenchay, in 1828 the khanate became a Russian possession and Ehsan Khan was rewarded with the governorship, conferred the rank of major-general of the Russian army and the title of campaign ataman of the Kangarlu militia.

The abolition of the khanate

In 1828 the khanates of Erivan and Nakhchivan were dissolved and their territories united to form the Armenian Oblast ("Armianskaia Oblast"). In 1840 that province was dissolved and its territory incorporated into a larger new province, the Georgia-Imeretia Governorate ("Gruziia-Imeretiia"). This new division did not last long – in 1845 a vast new territory called the Caucasian Territory ("Kavkazskii Krai") or Caucasian Viceregency ("Kavkazskoe Namestnichestvo") was created, in which the former Armenian Province formed part of a subdivision named the Tiflis Governorate. In 1849 the Erivan Governorate was established, separate from the Tiflis Governorate. It included the territory of the former Nakhchivan khanate, which became the province's Nakhchivan uyezd.

After the dissolution, the khans of Nakhchivan took the Russified surname Khan Nakhchivanski, and the men of its family traditionally entered the Russian public services, chiefly the army. The family remained very wealthy, were the biggest landowners in the district, and continued to exercise enormous influence over the rest of the Muslim community. Six Khans Nakhchivanski became generals in the Russian tsarist, Soviet and Iranian armies.

Two sons of Ehsan khan - Ismail khan and Kalbali khan - were generals in the Russian army and were awarded orders of Saint-George IV degree for their actions in battle. A son of Kalbali khan, Huseyn Khan Nakhchivanski, was a prominent Russian military commander and adjutant general of the Russian Emperor, and his nephews, Jamshid Khan and Kalbali, were generals in the Soviet and Iranian armies respectively.

Rulers

The rulers were:
1747–1787 - Heydar Qoli Khan
Haji Khan Kangarli
Rahim Khan
Ali Qoli Khan
Vali Qoli Khan
Abbas Qoli Khan
Jafar Qoli Khan
1787–1809 - Kalb-Ali Khan Kangarlu
Abbasqoli Khan Kangarli
Mohammadbagir Khan
1823–1828 - Ehsan Khan Kangarlu, Major General in the Russian Imperial Army, previously governor of Ordubad in 1822
1828–1834 - Karim Khan Kangarli

Notes

Sources

See also

Khanates of the Caucasus

1828 disestablishments
States and territories established in 1747
Khanates of the South Caucasus
Khanate of Nakhchivan
Vayots Dzor Province
Vassal and tributary states of the Zand dynasty